W'akherta Maak (English: To the End with You) is the second studio album by Lebanese singer Elissa released by Music Master on 8 August 2000. The album achieved wide success in the Arab world and ranked first in terms of sales upon its release. For three months, it occupied the first three spots in the best-selling albums chart along with the album Fi Eshg El Banat by singer Mohamed Mounir, which was released at the same time. As a result of the heavy demand and the limited availability of the first edition, eight additional editions were issued, with an average of 120,000 copies sold per edition. The album remained among the best-selling albums in the following year, in competition with the albums released at the end of 2000, such as Inta al Aziz and Jarhi Ana, and albums released at the beginning of the year 2001, such as Habib el Alb and Laila Habibi. However, its main rival was the album Tamally Maak, with which it competed in the best-selling albums chart for a whole year.

The album consisted of eleven songs, all written by Elias Nasser, and included a duet with Ragheb Alama titled "Betghib Betrouh". The song's music video won many awards, and as a result of its success, special editions were released under its name, which ranked first in the lists of the best-selling albums in Egypt. The duet also became among the most streamed songs for an entire year on Arab websites at the time. In 2001, Ragheb Alama included the song in his album Saharooni el Leil to take advantage of the wide success.

Track listing
All lyrics written by Elias Nasser.

Notes
"Wahyatt El Hob" is an Arabic-language cover of the 2000 Turkish song "Ya Hey" by Emrah. The song was included as an additional track in the form of a duet in Arabic with Emrah in the 2001 edition of W'akherta Maak.
"Sa'alna" is an Arabic-language cover of the 1999 Turkish song "Seninki" by Serdar Ortaç.
"Saharni Habibi" is an Arabic-language cover of the 1999 Turkish song "Asrın Hatası" by Serdar Ortaç.

Credits
Adapted from the album liner notes.
 Edouard Meunier - mixing
 Georges Youssef - design
 Nadine Ashkar - photographer

References

Elissa (singer) albums
2000 albums